Adam Seymour may refer to:

 Adam Seymour (cricketer) (born 1967), former English cricketer
 Adam Seymour (musician), guitarist and songwriter